Notelaea longifolia is a very common shrub or small tree in eastern Australia. Occurring in or adjacent to rainforest from Mimosa Rocks National Park (37° S) to Bamaga (11° S) in far north Queensland. An attractive ornamental plant.

Description 
Usually a shrub is around 3 metres tall, but occasionally it can be up to 9 metres tall, with a trunk diameter of 30 cm. The trunk is often crooked, the crown wide and dense. Grey brown bark is scaly, fissured and hard. Branchlets have small pale lenticels, otherwise pale brown and slender.

Leaves 

Leaves variable in size and shape. Some narrow lanceolate, others lanceolate and some a broad ovate shape. 3 to 16 cm long, 1 to 6 cm wide. Sometimes with a prominent tip, other times blunt. Leaves gradually tapering at the stem end. Dark green above, duller below, stiff and dry to touch. Leaf stalks absent or up to 8 mm long. Leaves veiny, but net veins are irregular and not as distinct as in Notelaea venosa.

Flowers and fruit 

Pale yellow flowers usually form between April and October on racemes at the leaf axils. Racemes are 2 cm long. Fruit matures from November to March. Being a dark blue or black fleshy drupe 10 to 16 mm long with a single pointed or egg shaped seed, 8 to 12 mm long. Regeneration from fresh seed is slow, taking up to a year.

References

  (other publication details, included in citation)

longifolia
Trees of Australia
Flora of New South Wales
Flora of Queensland
Ornamental trees
Plants described in 1803